Kiran Seth (born 1949) is an Indian academician, Professor Emeritus in the department of Mechanical Engineering at the Indian Institute of Technology Delhi. He is most known as the founder of SPIC MACAY (1977), a non-profit organisation which promotes Indian classical music, Indian classical dance, and other aspects Indian culture, amongst youth the world over; through its about 500 chapters and through conventions, baithaks, lectures and musical fests.

In 2009, he was awarded the Padma Shri by the Government of India for his contribution to the Arts.

Early life and education 
Seth was born on 27 April 1949. His father, Bhojraj Seth, was a mathematician and the first professor at the IIT Kharagpur, established in 1951, while his mother Bhagawathi Seth was a housewife.

Career 
Seth started his career working as a Member of the Technical Staff (MTS) at Bell Laboratories, New Jersey in 1974, a job he gave up to return to India in 1976 as an Assistant Professor to teach at IIT Delhi, where he has been working ever since. It was at IIT Delhi that he founded SPIC MACAY in 1977.

He served as Vice-Chairman of the Governing Council of the Film and Television Institute in Pune from 2012 to 2014.

SPIC MACAY 

Today the movement conducts concerts, lec-dems, talks, yoga workshops, classic film shows, theatre shows and craft workshops in schools and colleges so that young people might be inspired.

References

External links
 Kiran Seth at IIT Delhi
 "Many great civilizations are alive only in museums"

1949 births
IIT Kharagpur alumni
Columbia University alumni
Recipients of the Padma Shri in arts
Living people
Academic staff of IIT Delhi
People from Kharagpur